The 1914–15 Kansas Jayhawks men's basketball team represented the University of Kansas during the 1914–15 college men's basketball season, their 16 season. The Jayhawks, members of the MVIAA, who coached by sixth-year coach W.O. Hamilton. The Jayhawks finished the season 16–1 and won the MVIAA Championship, their 7th conference championship. On January 13, 1915, the Jayhawks defeated Warrensburg (now known as Central Missouri) who were coached by former Jayhawk basketball player and future long-time Kansas head coach Phog Allen, in what was the second of two games Allen coached against his alma mater. Ralph Sproull was retroactively named an All-American by the Helms Foundation, making him the second Jayhawk to earn the honor.

Roster
Hilmar Appel
Lawrence Cole
Ray Dunmire
Ray Folks
Karl Kaiser
Ephraim Sorensen
Ralph Sproull
Arthur Weaver

Schedule and results

References

Kansas
Kansas Jayhawks men's basketball seasons
Kansas Jayhawks Men's Basketball Team
Kansas Jayhawks Men's Basketball Team